The 2011 Pacific hurricane season was a below average season in terms of named storms, although it had an above average number of hurricanes and major hurricanes. During the season, 13 tropical depressions formed along with 11 tropical storms, 10 hurricanes and 6 major hurricanes. The season officially began on May 15 in the East Pacific Ocean, and on June 1 in the Central Pacific; they ended on November 30. These dates conventionally delimit the period of each year when most tropical cyclones form in the Pacific basin. However, the formation of tropical cyclones is possible at any time of the year.

Despite the decrease in storms, there were several intense and destructive hurricanes this season. Hurricane Beatriz killed four people in Southwestern Mexico. Hurricane Jova killed eight and caused $203.67 million (2011 USD) in damage to Western Mexico. Tropical Depression Twelve-E killed 30 people in Central America. Meanwhile, Kenneth became the strongest November storm at the time. Hurricane Hilary brought additional flooding to Southwestern Mexico.

Seasonal forecasts

On May 19, the Climate Prediction Center released its pre-season outlook. The scientists stated a 70% chance of a below-normal season, a 25% chance of a near-normal season and a 5% chance of an above-normal season. The climatologists expected 9–15 named storms, with 5–8 becoming hurricanes, and 1–3 becoming major hurricanes. The accumulated cyclone energy was expected to be 45 to 105% of the median. The below-normal activity forecast was because of increased wind shear and a high expectation of El Niño–Southern Oscillation (ENSO)-neutral conditions (no El Niño or La Niña) throughout the peak months of July, August and September, together with lingering La Niña conditions at the beginning of the season.

Seasonal summary

The season got off to an active start with first storm, Adrian, becoming one of only a handful of tropical cyclones to attain Category 4 status in June. Four other storms, Dora, Eugene, Hilary, and Kenneth attained Category 4 status. Dora was the strongest storm of the year, peaking at 155 mph, just short of Category 5 status. The month of August was about average in terms of the number of storms, with the strongest of the month being Eugene. However, the first half of September had very little activity, due to the return of a La Niña event. Tropical Depression Eight-E was the only storm in the first half of September, when it dissipated on September 1.

Hilary became the second storm to form in September, becoming the fourth major hurricane of the season, during the afternoon hours of September 22. After Hilary, Jova unexpectedly became the fifth major hurricane of the season during the early morning hours of October 10. Tropical Depression Twelve-E killed 30 people in Central America when it made landfall near El Salvador on October 12. On November 19, Kenneth formed as a tropical depression and quickly strengthened into a hurricane two days later. Kenneth became the first major hurricane in November and latest-forming major hurricane in the eastern north Pacific basin in the satellite era, until being surpassed by Hurricane Sandra in 2015; the last to do so was Winnie in 1983, which only peaked at Category 1 hurricane status. Hurricane Kenneth, however, intensified to attain Category 4 status on November 22, which broke the record at the time.

The accumulated cyclone energy (ACE) index for the 2011 Pacific hurricane season as calculated by Colorado State University using data from the National Hurricane Center was 120.9 units. Broadly speaking, ACE is a measure of the power of a tropical or subtropical storm multiplied by the length of time it existed.

Systems

Hurricane Adrian

In early June, a well-defined area of low pressure produced disorganized weather several hundred miles from the Pacific coast of Mexico. Upon developing, the depression was located over warm sea surface temperatures, and upper-level wind shear in its vicinity was forecast to remain conducive for intensification.

Steady strengthening continued, and Adrian became a hurricane early on June 9 as it tracked toward the west-northwest along high pressure over Mexico. The storm subsequently entered a phase of rapid intensification, developing a distinct eye with good outflow aloft. For several hours, the hurricane exhibited what appeared to be an annular structure, maintaining an unusually large eye and symmetric central dense overcast. As a result, eyewall replacement cycles were not expected to occur, and Adrian was forecast to remain well-organized and only slowly weaken in response to slightly cooler waters. However, the hurricane defied predictions and began devolving rapidly the next day, likely due to "an unexpectedly early increase of vertical wind shear coupled with marginal thermodynamics" as noted by the NHC. On June 11, Adrian was downgraded to tropical storm status, recurving toward the west as a tight swirl of low-level clouds with little to no deep convection near its center.
It further weakened to a tropical depression the next day, and by 1500 UTC Adrian remained without convection and was declassified as a tropical cyclone while decelerating to the northwest. The outer rainbands of Hurricane Adrian brought widespread rainfall in Mexico.

Hurricane Beatriz

On June 14, the NHC noted a large area of scattered showers and thunderstorms associated with a monsoon trough over the east Pacific, several hundred miles from the coast of Acapulco, Mexico. A quasi-stationary surface low formed in association with the activity, and over the subsequent days convection consolidated in the vicinity of an anticyclone over the southwestern Caribbean. Curved rainbands began developing around the center, and on June 19 the system acquired sufficient organization to be classified as a tropical depression.

After moving along the coast, it weakened to a tropical storm and dissipated the next day. But the NHC noted that Beatriz's remnants still had a near 0% chance of redeveloping, as they remained almost stationary. But on June 23, convection dissipated, and Beatriz's remnants slowly began to accelerate to the west, as the remnant low dissipated rapidly. Late on June 24, the remnants of Hurricane Beatriz dissipated completely, to the southwest of the Baja California Peninsula.

Several landslides blocked off roads and a  section of a roundabout was destroyed. In the community of Amatillo, three people were killed after being washed away by flood waters. Heavy rains from Beatriz caused the Sabana River to overflow its banks, placing 150 homes across 14 colonias under water.

Hurricane Calvin

On July 5, an area of showers and thunderstorms formed south of the Gulf of Tehuantepec associated with a broad area of low pressure. The system slowly organized, and the National Hurricane Center designated the system Tropical Depression Three-E on July 7. By the next day, the tropical depression gained enough organization to be named Calvin. Calvin strengthened into a hurricane and attained peak strength early on July 9 before rapidly weakening later that day. Calvin degenerated into a remnant low early on July 10. During the next 3 days, Calvin's remnants quickly moved to the west, while dissipating rapidly. On July 13, Calvin's remnants dissipated completely, just to the east of the Central Pacific Ocean.

Hurricane Dora

In the early morning hours of July 14, a tropical wave had moved off the Colombian coast. The wave gained convection as it moved into the southwestern Caribbean, and the National Hurricane Center (NHC) began to monitor the disturbance, giving it a 10% chance of development into a tropical cyclone. Over the rest of the day, the storm continued to move westward until it moved ashore on the Nicaragua/Costa Rica border the next day. On July 16, the National Hurricane Center began monitoring the area of low pressure off the coast of Guatemala. Slowly organizing, the low-pressure area had gained enough strength to be declared Tropical Depression Four-E during the morning hours of July 18. Just three hours later, the system was upgraded to Dora, the fourth tropical storm of the 2011 Pacific hurricane season. Continuing to organize, Dora reached hurricane strength late on July 20, before rapidly intensifying into a major hurricane later the next day. Strengthening further, Dora reached a peak of  early on July 21, making it a Category 4 hurricane on the Saffir–Simpson hurricane scale. However, after entering cooler waters, Dora began to weaken the next day. On July 23, Dora was downgraded to a tropical storm, and the next day, Dora was no longer a tropical cyclone. As a remnant low, the circulation began to curve around the high-pressure area that had steered Dora for much of its existence on July 25. Early on July 26, the remnants of Hurricane Dora dissipated completely, over Central Baja California.

Hurricane Eugene

On early July 31, a tropical wave developed into a tropical depression in the eastern Pacific a few hundred miles south of Mexico. Meteorologists numbered it "Five-E". It was upgraded to Tropical Storm Eugene only 6 hours after becoming a tropical depression. On the afternoon of August 1, Eugene strengthened into a Category 1 hurricane on the Saffir–Simpson hurricane scale. The next day Eugene further strengthened into a Category 2 hurricane. Early on August 3 Eugene further strengthened into a Category 3 hurricane, making it the third major hurricane of the season. Eugene was expected to weaken after becoming a Category 3. Eugene quickly weakened on August 5 because of unfavorable conditions, dropping from Category 2 status to tropical storm status in only 18 hours. On August 6, Eugene became a post-tropical low as the center of the storm was void of strong convection. During the next few days, Eugene's remnants continued to move westward slowly, while weakening gradually. On August 10, the remnants of Hurricane Eugene dissipated roughly 980 mi (1,555 km) east of Hawaii.

Tropical Storm Fernanda

The tropical wave that spawned Tropical Storm Emily in the Atlantic Ocean crossed Central America into the East Pacific on August 6. Producing disorganized deep convection, a surface circulation became discernible on August 13, and the formation of showers and thunderstorms in curved bands around the circulation signified the formation of Tropical Depression Six-E by 18:00 UTC on August 15, about 1,400 nautical miles east-southeast of Hawai'i. An increase deep convection resulted in the depression strengthening into Tropical Storm Fernanda at 6:00 UTC the next morning. A relaxation in shear allowed Fernanda to become more organized and reach an intensity of 45 knots (50 mph) later that day. Fernanda initially moved west under the influence of a subtropical ridge, but it turned northwest through a weakness in the ridge on August 17 into more favorable conditions and strengthened to a peak intensity of 70 mph winds and a minimum pressure of 992 millibars at 6:00 UTC on August 18. Fernanda was the only named storm this season not to clear hurricane strength.

Shortly after reaching peak intensity, the storm crossed into the Central Pacific basin. Continuing west-northwestward, Fernanda began weakening late on August 18 as dry, stable air was entrained into its circulation and it encountered increasing south-southeasterly shear. Most of Fernanda's deep convection had dissipated by August 20, and it degenerated to a remnant low. The post-tropical low continued westward before dissipating the next day a couple hundred nautical miles south of the Hawaiian Islands.

Hurricane Greg

On the afternoon of August 16, a vigorous area of low pressure developed into Tropical Depression Seven-E. It was upgraded to Tropical Storm Greg 12 hours after formation. The storm steadily intensified over  sea surface temperatures and it reached hurricane status late on August 17 with maximum sustained winds of 75 mph. Greg continued strengthening to attain peak winds of 85 mph and a pressure of 980 mbar. Soon afterward, the storm began to gradually weaken due to cooler waters and higher wind shear and on August 19, Greg weakened to tropical storm strength, with maximum sustained winds of 65 mph. The storm continued to weaken as it encountered unfavorable wind shear and as it began to traverse cooler waters, and on August 20 Greg had weakened to a tropical depression. Greg maintained tropical depression status until August 21, when it degenerated into a remnant low. During that day, Greg's remnants moved northeastward due to a High Pressure System. From late on August 22, until the early afternoon of August 23, Greg's remnants impacted Southern California, bringing overcast skies, even though the center of circulation itself moved southeastward slowly and was positioned far southwest of Southern California. Greg's remnants continued to drift westwards, as they weakened rapidly. Late on August 24, the remnants of Hurricane Greg dissipated completely, far west of the southern tip of the Baja California Peninsula.

Tropical Depression Eight-E

The National Hurricane Center (NHC) began to monitor an area of disturbed weather southwest of the Mexican Riviera in late August. Initially, poorly organized, environmental conditions were conductive for some development. Shortly thereafter, the cloud patterns improved and overall thunderstorm activity increased. This held true, and at 1500 UTC August 31, the low was upgraded into a tropical depression, but no further intensification was anticipated.
Eight-E soon made landfall on Southwestern Mexico, and moved north-northwestwards, as it rapidly weakened. Eight-E dissipated to a remnant low several hours later, early on September 1. However, the remnants of Tropical Depression Eight-E survived, and they as they began moving westward, the remnants impacted Western Mexico. During the early afternoon of September 1, the remnants of Eight-E moved off the western coast of Western Mexico. During the next day, the remnants strengthened slightly in intensity, as it moved northwestward, towards the Baja California Peninsula. But late on September 2, the remnants of Tropical Depression Eight-E dissipated completely, just southeast of the peninsula.

Hurricane Hilary

A tropical disturbance gained enough organization early on September 21 to be declared as a tropical depression, the ninth of the season. Continuing to organize, the depression strengthened into a tropical storm several hours later. On September 22, the meteorologists declared Hilary as a Category 1 hurricane, becoming the seventh of the season. On September 22, it rapidly strengthened into a small, Category 4 hurricane, featuring a well-defined eye and very deep convection. AST September 22). However, the storm began to enter an area of higher wind shear and cooler ocean temperatures on September 24, and Hilary began to weaken. The hurricane weakened back down to a Category 3 hurricane early on September 25, but was later upgraded briefly to a Category 4 again the following afternoon. Several hours later, the storm was once again downgraded into a Category 3 hurricane, and during the afternoon hours of September 27, Hilary was further downgraded into a Category 2 hurricane. Early the following morning, Hilary weakened into a Category 1 hurricane, and weakened into a tropical storm on September 28. Losing a lot of its convection on September 30, the National Hurricane Center noted that Hilary had weakened into a tropical depression. Several hours later, after sustaining no deep convection atop its centre, Hilary was declared a remnant low, located several hundred miles away from any landmasses.

Tropical cyclone warnings and watches were also issued for portion of the coast. Large swells were also expected. A red (emergency) alert was issued for parts of the coast. Officials urged residents to be prepared to evacuate. The port of Acapulco was closed for small craft. A moderate to high alert of rain and wind was noted. The storm's outer bands produced heavy rainfall over Chiapas and Tabasco, with accumulations in Tabasco reaching  in 24 hours. Several rivers across the region overflowed their banks and flooded nearby areas. In Villahermosa, heavy rain collapsed drains and many streets were flooded. In addition, cars were stranded in floodwaters. Across Colima, waves reached .

Hurricane Jova

During the late hours of October 4, an area of showers and thunderstorms associated with a broad low-pressure area developed several hundred miles to the south-southwest of Acapulco, Mexico. Moving slowly towards the west, the area of disturbed weather quickly organized. Late on October 5, the National Hurricane Center (NHC) noted that the area had a high chance of developing into a tropical cyclone over the next 48 hours. Just several hours later, the NHC began issuing advisories on Tropical Depression Ten-E, several hundred miles to the south of Manzanillo, Mexico. A more gradual type of development took place after then, and the depression was upgraded into Tropical Storm Jova on the afternoon of October 6. Taking advantage of the favorable environment Jova was embedded within, the storm became a hurricane on October 8, and by October 10, the storm was upgraded to a Category 3 hurricane on the Saffir–Simpson hurricane scale. However, shortly thereafter, the storm began an eyewall replacement cycle and weakened to a lower-end Category 2 hurricane. Several hours after landfall in Mexico, Jova dissipated, very early on October 13.

Hurricane Irwin

The origins of Hurricane Irwin can be tracked back to an area of showers and thunderstorms associated with a low-pressure area that developed several hundred miles to the south of Mexico. Moving towards the west and west-northwest, the low pressure quickly gained organization, and during the pre-dawn hours of October 6, the National Hurricane Center began issuing advisories on newly formed Tropical Depression Eleven-E. Later on October 6, Tropical Depression Eleven-E strengthened to Tropical Storm Irwin, and it became a hurricane the next day. The next day it weakened to a tropical storm. Unlike most tropical cyclones that form in the eastern Pacific Ocean, Irwin's track was very unusual. The system which originally started moving westward, turned north, then east and again back south, and east until dissipation, on October 17, as a remnant low. Also, between October 11 and 14, Irwin weakened into a tropical depression twice and again re-strengthened back to a tropical storm before finally weakening into a tropical depression on October 15. The depression turned west again and dissipated into a remnant low in the late hours of October 16. But the remnants of Tropical Storm Irwin continued to move westward generally, until it dissipated completely, on October 17.

Tropical Depression Twelve-E

A tropical wave, the same that spawned Hurricane Phillipe in the Atlantic, crossed Central America into the East Pacific on October 5, during a significant pulse of the MJO. In this favorable environment, the wave generated a low-pressure area in the ITCZ by 18:00 UTC on October 6. Despite initially being hindered by the development of easterly wind shear, the low produced sustain deep convection late on October 11, and organized sufficiently to become Tropical Depression Twelve-E by 00:00 UTC on October 12. The depression moved northward without strengthening and made landfall at 16:00 UTC that day near Paredón, Mexico. The depression rapidly weakened to a remnant low eight hours later and dissipated completely early the next day.

The depression brought torrential rains that caused severe flooding in southeast Mexico and neighboring Guatemala. Up to 12 inches (305 mm) of rain fell in Guatemala, though not all of it may be because of Twelve-E. 36 deaths were directly attributed to the depression by the government of Guatemala. Numerous additional fatalities resulted in Central America from the pulse of the MJO that helped spawn the depression.

Hurricane Kenneth

Kenneth originated from an area full of unsettled weather that developed off the coast of Guatemala on November 16. A low-pressure area formed shortly thereafter, and organization of the system began to improve on November 17 as it moved westward. The low remained over an area with favorable conditions for formation on November 18, although convective activity tapered slightly later during the day as it began to curve west-northwestward. The system continued to coalesce overnight, and the circulation of the low was more prominent by the following morning. By November 19, the disturbance had gained enough organization to be declared as a tropical depression, the thirteenth of the season. The following day, the depression continued to intensify, and was upgraded to a tropical storm, receiving the name Kenneth. Rapid strengthening began on November 21, and Kenneth was upgraded to a hurricane. As rapid intensification continued, Kenneth strengthened into a Category 3 major hurricane with sustained winds of 125 mph on November 22. Rapid intensification continued and the storm was upgraded to a Category 4 hurricane with sustained winds of 145 mph, just a few hours later, as Kenneth reached its peak intensity. The cause for this rapid intensification just days before the end of the season was unclimatologically low wind shear as well as unusually warm waters directly in the storm's path. However, Kenneth's intensification was short-lived; immediately it moved into an environment of colder waters and stronger wind shear, and started to rapidly deteriorate. Just 24 hours after the cyclone reached its peak, it dropped below hurricane strength and lost most of its central convection. Afterwards, Kenneth weakened at a slower rate, but by November 25, had weakened to a tropical depression, losing almost all of its convection. Early on November 25, Kenneth weakened to a remnant low, with its circulation void of any strong convection. But for the next 3 days, the remnant of the storm continued moving northwestward rapidly as a convectionless vortex, before dissipating completely early on November 28.

In the first discussion bulletin, Forecaster Robbie Berg commented that it was the latest-forming tropical cyclone in the North Pacific east of 140°W since Tropical Depression Twenty-Two-E on November 24, 1987, and Kenneth was the latest forming named storm since Winnie in 1983. Kenneth strengthened to a major hurricane on November 22, becoming the latest-forming major hurricane in the eastern north Pacific basin in the satellite era. Kenneth was upgraded to Category 4 a few hours later, becoming the most powerful late-season storm ever recorded in the eastern north Pacific. However, 2015's Hurricane Sandra surpassed both records when it attained major hurricane status much later than Kenneth, being upgraded to a Category 4 on November 26, 2015.

Storm names
The following names were used for named storms that formed in the North East Pacific in 2011. Names that were not used are marked in gray. This is the same list used in the 2005 season. No names were retired this year, so this list was used again in the 2017 season.

For storms that form in the Central Pacific Hurricane Center's area of responsibility, encompassing the area between 140 degrees west and the International Date Line, all names are used in a series of four rotating lists. The next four names that were slated for use in 2011 are shown below; however, none of them were used.

Season effects
This is a table of all of the storms in the 2011 Pacific hurricane season. It includes their durations, peak intensities, names, areas affected, damages, and death totals. Deaths in parentheses are additional and indirect (an example of an indirect death would be a traffic accident), but are still storm-related. Damage and deaths include totals while the storm was extratropical or a wave or a low. All of the damage figures are in 2011 USD.

See also

 Tropical cyclones in 2011
 List of Pacific hurricanes
 Pacific hurricane season
 2011 Atlantic hurricane season
 2011 Pacific typhoon season
 2011 North Indian Ocean cyclone season
 South-West Indian Ocean cyclone seasons: 2010–11, 2011–12
 Australian region cyclone seasons: 2010–11, 2011–12
 South Pacific cyclone seasons: 2010–11, 2011–12
 South Atlantic tropical cyclone

Notes

References

External links

 National Hurricane Center Website
 National Hurricane Center's Eastern Pacific Tropical Weather Outlook
 Servicio Meteorológico Nacional Website 
NHC 2011 Pacific hurricane season archive

 
Pacific hurricane seasons
2011 Epac